Yeremyan, Yeremian, Eremyan is an Armenian surname, derived from the given name Jeremiah. Notable people with the surname include:

 Arman Yeremyan (born 1986), Armenian taekwondo athlete
 Hasmik Yeremyan (born 1992), Armenian footballer
 Suren Yeremian (1908 - 1992), Armenian historian and cartographer

Armenian-language surnames
Patronymic surnames
Surnames from given names